Local elections in Serbia were held on 28 March 2021 in the municipalities of Zaječar, Kosjerić and Preševo, and on 17 October in Mionica and Negotin.

The ruling Serbian Progressive Party (SNS) won a majority of seats in the city assemblies of Zaječar and Kosjerić, while the Alternative for Changes (APN) led by Shqiprim Arifi won a majority of seats in Preševo. Some non-governmental organisations have reported electoral irregularities in Zaječar and Kosjerić, including physical attacks to some journalists and ballot leaders; no irregularities were reported in Preševo.

Later that year, SNS also managed to win a majority of seats in the city assemblies of Mionica and Negotin. Physical attacks towards opposition activists in Negotin sparked national-level media attention, while the People's Party (NS) claimed that electoral irregularities were present at voting stations.

Background 
The previous local elections in Zaječar and Kosjerić were held in 2017. An opposition civic group named "Movement for Krajina" led by Boško Ničić, won the election in Zaječar with 31.9% of the popular vote, while the SNS-led list placed second with 30.82%. In September 2017, Ničić unexpectedly merged his civic group into SNS, directly giving SNS a majority of seats in the city assembly. SNS won 32.3% of the popular vote in Kosjerić, double more than the list led by the Democratic Party (DS), and it retained the majority by aligning with the pro-government parties, Movement of Socialists and the Serbian People's Party.

Preševo, a municipality in which Albanians make a majority of the population, experienced political crisis between 2017 and 2021. The crisis began in September 2017, when the local city council was replaced by a temporary body led by the president of the Municipality of Preševo, Shqiprim Arifi. It was dissolved because no sessions were held since 24 May according to the law on local self-governments. The local government was dissolved on 18 September 2017. Multiple elections were held in December 2017, January 2018, and June 2020. Albanian minority parties won a majority of seats in those elections. In December 2020, the local city council was dissolved again and a temporary body was introduced because there were no sessions held since 27 August. Arifi, who was re-elected in 2018, was chosen as the head of the temporary body since he served as the president of the municipality.

Electoral system 
Local elections in Serbia are held under a proportional representation system in the area of a municipality or a city as a whole. Shortly prior to the election, parties must submit a ballot list and their ballot leader; after the election, elected members vote to elect a mayor or the president of a municipality. One mandate of a mayor, president of a municipality or an elected member of a local assembly lasts four years.

Results and campaigns

Zaječar 
On 9 March, the Party of United Pensioners of Serbia (PUPS) submitted their ballot list for the election, but were denied participation by the City Election Commission due to deficiencies in the electoral list, after which the Commission declared their ballot to be invalid three days later. On 24 March, together with the United Peasant Party (USS) they announced their support for the Serbian Progressive Party.

On 27 February, mayor Ničić met with construction, transport and infrastructure minister Tomislav Momirović to discuss about expanding local infrastructure in Zaječar. During the last election week, Ana Brnabić and Aleksandar Vučić both visited Zaječar. Multiple ministers also visited the town during the election campaign.

In the municipality of Zaječar, there were 50,463 eligible citizens that were able to vote in the 2021 local election. The local City Election Commission reported that the turnout was 49.81%. The Serbian Progressive Party (SNS) won 24 seats, and secured the majority together with the Socialist Party of Serbia–United Serbia (SPS–JS), which won 4 seats. The Nenad Ristović List placed second with 16 seats, while the Dragana Rašić List won 4 seats. The Dejan Krstić List and a list headed by the Enough is Enough (DJB) won one seat each.

Kosjerić 
Election campaigning was also prominent in Kosjerić, although opposition parties that boycotted the 2020 parliamentary election decided to not take part in the local elections, stating that "the elections won't be free and fair". Several high officials were spotted during the election campaigns, such as Ivica Dačić and the finance minister Siniša Mali. On 9 March, a basketball club was offered a donation by SNS, which they declined claiming it as "cheap election propaganda".

In the Municipality of Kosjerić, there were 9,332 eligible citizens that were able to vote in the election. The local Election Commission reported that the turnout was 73%. Around 13:00 on election day, a woman collapsed and died after leaving a polling station. The list headed by the Serbian Progressive Party (SNS) won a majority of 20 seats, while the Clean People for Clean Kosjerić list won 3 seats, the National Democratic Alternative coalition (headed by the POKS and Democratic Party of Serbia) won 2 seats including Healthy Serbia, who also won 2 seats.

Preševo 
Political events in Preševo, including the crisis, influenced the election to take place, in which a new local city council was elected. Numerous Serb parties, led by the Serbian Progressive Party, declared a common list in early March 2021.

In the Municipality of Preševo, there were 41,847 eligible citizens to vote in the local election. The local Election Commission reported that the turnout was 43%. The Alternative for Changes list headed by Shqiprim Arifi won 14 seats and followed by them, the Democratic Party of Albanians won 9 seats, Party for Democratic Action won 7 seats, Movement for Reforms list won 5 seats, the Serbian Progressive Party-headed list won 2 seats and the Democratic Union of Albanians won 1 seat.

Mionica 
The Serbian Progressive Party together with the Party of United Pensioners of Serbia submitted their common list on 2 September, while the Alliance 90/Greens of Serbia submitted their ballot on 24 September and the National Democratic Alternative on 28 September. The Socialist Party of Serbia decided to cooperate with the far-right Serbian Radical Party to form a common list which was submitted on 29 September. Besides these lists, the Healthy Serbia and two civic groups "Free Citizens of Mionica" and "Democracy on the old place" participated in the local election. During the election campaign, environmental protection minister Irena Vujović and minister Momirović were spotted in Mionica.

In the Municipality of Mionica, there were 10,989 eligible citizens to vote in the local election. The local Election Commission reported that the turnout was 69%. The list headed by the Serbian Progressive Party won 31 seats and followed by them, the list headed by the Socialist Party of Serbia won 4 seats, while the "Free Citizens of Mionica" and National Democratic Alternative won 2 seats respectively.

Negotin 
On 4 September, the Serbian Progressive Party and Socialist Party of Serbia submitted a common list for the election with Vladimir Veličković, an SNS commissioner in Negotin, as the ballot carrier. The Serbian Radical Party submitted their ballot on 19 September, and on the same day the Election Commission accepted it. Vuk Jeremić, the leader of the People's Party (NS), a centre-right opposition party, announced on 15 September that his party will be participating the upcoming local election in Negotin, after boycotting previous local and nation-wide elections since 2020. Jeremić also stated that the decision wasn't made easy and that the upcoming election will be an "experiment" regarding the electoral condition. On 22 September, they submitted their list, with Krsta Stanković Njenulović as the ballot carrier. Boris Tadić, the leader of the Social Democratic Party, criticised this move by comparing this situation to when his party was declared "traitorous" because it violated the boycott decision in 2020. The National Democratic Alternative submitted their list on 24 September, six days after they began their electoral campaign. The Party of United Pensioners of Serbia, formally submitted their ballot list on 18 September, although they weren't able to qualify because 245 signatures were missing. In late September, the Alliance 90/Greens of Serbia submitted their ballot. Their election list, together with Healthy Serbia's list, was accepted on 1 October. In total, six lists participated in the election.

In the Municipality of Negotin, there were 37,313 eligible citizens to vote in the local election. The Election Commission reported that the turnout was 39%, and the list headed by the Serbian Progressive Party won 38 seats and followed by them, the People's Party won 6 seats and the Alliance 90/Greens of Serbia won one seat.

Physical attacks towards opposition activists took place during voting, while the People's Party claimed that the "SNS stole about 20% of votes and gave it away to lists that didn't manage to pass the electoral threshold", and that they will file complaints as soon as possible. On 20 October, the Election Commission announced that they rejected the objections. POKS and SPS have both stated that they are satisfied with their results.

Aftermath 
The Serbian Progressive Party won a majority of seats in four municipalities, except Preševo, where they only won two seats. One of the major opposition candidates in Zaječar was Nenad Ristović who placed third in the 2017 Zaječar local election. After the 2021 election, Ristović pledged again to not cooperate with SNS. SNS managed to form a government with SPS, and Ničić was successfully re-elected as mayor in May 2021. SNS managed to form governments in Kosjerić, Mionica and Negotin. In November 2021, it was found out that government of Zaječar did not adopt anti-corruption plans.

References 

Elections in Serbia
Local elections in Serbia
2021 elections in Serbia
March 2021 events in Serbia
October 2021 events in Serbia